Nikita Nikolayevich Khlusov (born 16 January 2000) is a Russian footballer who plays as a forward for Krylia Sovetov Samara.

Club career
Khlusov made his debut for Krylia Sovetov Samara on 30 August 2022 in a Russian Cup game against Spartak Moscow.

Career statistics

References

External links
 
 
 
 

Living people
2000 births
Russian footballers
Footballers from Saint Petersburg
Association football forwards
Russia youth international footballers
Russian Second League players
FC Leningradets Leningrad Oblast players
PFC Krylia Sovetov Samara players